Diisopropyl ether is secondary ether that is used as a solvent. It is a colorless liquid that is slightly soluble in water, but miscible with organic solvents. It is used as an extractant and an oxygenate gasoline additive.  It is obtained industrially as a byproduct in the production of isopropanol by hydration of propylene. Diisopropyl ether is sometimes represented by the abbreviation DIPE.

Uses
Whereas at 20 °C, diethyl ether will dissolve 1% by weight water, diisopropyl ether only dissolves 0.88%.  Diisopropyl ether is used as a specialized solvent to remove or extract polar organic compounds from aqueous solutions, e.g. phenols, ethanol, acetic acid. It has also been used as an antiknock agent.

In the laboratory, diisopropyl ether is useful for recrystallizations because it has a wide liquid range.  Diisopropyl ether is used for converting bromoboranes, which are thermally labile, into isopropoxy derivatives.

Safety
Diisopropyl ether forms explosive peroxides upon standing in air. This reaction proceeds more easily than for ethyl ether due to the increased lability of the  C-H bond adjacent to oxygen. Many explosions have been known to occur during handling or processing of old diisopropyl ether. Some laboratory procedures recommend use of freshly opened bottles. Antioxidants can be used to prevent this process. The stored solvent are generally be tested for the presence of peroxides.  It is recommended once every 3 months for diisopropyl ether compared to once every 12 months for ethyl ether. Peroxides may be removed by shaking the ether with an aqueous solution of iron(II) sulfate or sodium metabisulfite. For safety reasons, methyl tert-butyl ether is often used as an alternative solvent.

See also 
 Dimethyl ether
 Diethyl ether
 Dipropyl ether
 Di-tert-butyl ether
 Methyl tert-butyl ether
List of gasoline additives

References

External links

Dialkyl ethers
Ether solvents
Oxygenates
Isopropyl compounds
Symmetrical ethers
Sweet-smelling chemicals